William, Will, or Willie Burns may refer to:

Politics and law
William Burns (Scottish historian) (1809–1876), Scottish lawyer and historian
William D. Burns (born 1973), Illinois state representative
W. Haydon Burns (1912–1987), governor of Florida
William Herbert Burns (1878–1964), Canadian politician, merchant, and Olympic curling champion
William J. Burns (1861–1932), American director of the Bureau of Investigation (predecessor to the FBI) 1921–1924
William J. Burns (diplomat) (born 1956), CIA director and former United States Deputy Secretary of State
William L. Burns (1913–2005), member of the New York State Assembly

Sports

William Burns (cricketer) (1883–1916), English cricketer
William Burns (lacrosse) (1875–1953), Canadian Olympic lacrosse player
William Burns (referee) (1952–2019), English football referee
Tosher Burns (William Burns, 1902–1984), Irish international footballer of the 1920s
Will Burns (racing driver) (born 1990), British racing driver
Willie Burns (1916–1966), American Negro league baseball player

Others
William Burns (saddler) (1769–1790), brother of Robert Burns the poet
William Chalmers Burns (1815–1868), Scottish evangelist and missionary
William Wallace Burns (1825–1892), American soldier
William Burns (died 1907), victim of lynching in Cumberland, Maryland

See also
Bill Burns (disambiguation)
Billy Burns (disambiguation)
William Burn (disambiguation)
William Byrne (disambiguation)
William Burnes (1721–1784), father of poet Robert Burns 
Burns (surname)